Türi is a town in Järva County, Estonia. It is the administrative centre of Türi Parish. Since 2000, Türi is known as the "spring capital" of Estonia. It has a railway station on the Tallinn - Viljandi railway line operated by Elron (rail transit).

History 
1347 Türi first mentioned in historical records by the German language name of Turgel
1687 The establishment of the first school
1900 Railway traffic (Viljandi–Tallinn, Türi–Paide) opened
1917 Türi gains the rights of a market town
1924 The first secondary education institution in Türi opened – Türi Horticultural Gymnasium
1926 The rights of a town given to Türi
1937 Erection of a  radio mast. The mast was blown up by soviet forces in 1941
1950 - 1959  Türi - the centre of Türi County.
1995 Türi Museum opened.
1997 Türi College of the University of Tartu for environmental science studies opened
2000 Türi declared the Spring Capital of Estonia by Mart Laar, the prime minister of Estonia
2005 Türi became the administrative centre of newly formed Türi Parish.

Climate

Sights

Türi Church
Türi Church, originally dedicated to St. Martin, is a well-preserved medieval hall church of a form typical for central Estonia. Construction of the church probably started in the late 13th century and the ceiling was completed in the early 14th century. It retains much of its medieval look, including carved stone details such as consoles in the form of human heads. Other noteworthy interior details include the renaissance pulpit, a Baroque retable (by Christian Ackermann) and an altar painting by A. Pezold from 1856.

Gallery

See also
JK Ganvix Türi

References

External links

Cities and towns in Estonia
Former municipalities of Estonia
Türi Parish